Roxie is an American sitcom and a spin-off of Kate & Allie (in which the main character appeared, albeit with a different name) that aired for only two episodes on April 1, 1987,  and April 8, 1987 on CBS.

Premise
Andrea Martin played a TV programmer for WNYV, a UHF station, in New York City.

Cast
Andrea Martin as Roxie Brinkerhoff
Teresa Ganzel as Marcie McKinley
Mitchell Laurance as Michael Brinkerhoff
Jerry Pavlon as Randy Grant
Jack Riley as Leon Buchanan
Ernie Sabella as Vito Carteri

Episodes

References

External links
IMDb
TV.com

1987 American television series debuts
1987 American television series endings
1980s American sitcoms
1980s American workplace comedy television series
American television spin-offs
CBS original programming
English-language television shows
Television series about television
Television shows set in New York City